Nowa Wioska  (German Neudörfel) is a village in the administrative district of Gmina Krzyżanowice, within Racibórz County, Silesian Voivodeship, in southern Poland, close to the Czech border.

References

Villages in Racibórz County